The Ministry of Energy and Natural Resources (French: Ministère de l'Énergie et des Ressources naturelles) is responsible for the management of natural resource extraction in the province of Quebec.

The current Minister is Jonatan Julien.
Quebec's Natural Resources are lumber, water, mines, and energy.

Responsibilities 
MNRW is responsible for managing the natural resources of Quebec: plants, minerals, wood, energy, etc.

References

External links
 Ministry of Energy and Natural Resources web site

Natural Resources
Quebec
Quebec

Environmental organizations based in Quebec